The ThinkPad 8 is a business-oriented tablet computer with an eight-inch touchscreen, released by Lenovo in January 2014.  It is one of the Lenovo's first Windows-based small-screen tablet devices, along with the Lenovo Miix 2, and also one of the first with a high-resolution full HD display.  Along with the first-generation ThinkPad 10, it is part of the third generation of ThinkPad-branded tablets, succeeding the ThinkPad Tablet 2.

Specifications 
The ThinkPad 8 has an 8.3-inch multi-touch IPS display with a 1920×1200 resolution and 16:10 aspect ratio.  It is powered by Intel's "Bay Trail" quad-core mobile Atom Z3770 CPU, has two gigabytes of RAM, and comes with up to 128 gigabytes of internal flash storage.  Micro-HDMI and USB ports allow use with an external display, and a keyboard or mouse.  A microSD card slot allows storage upgrades.  Models with Wi-Fi only and units with additional 4G cellular data connectivity are both available.  Stereo sound is delivered through a pair of speakers placed on the device's back side.

Its back is made from machine-cut aluminum and the front is all black. The rear eight-megapixel camera is surrounded by a red accent, while the two-megapixel front-facing camera blends into the face. An optional so-called "quickshot cover" magnetically attaches to the device and wakes it upon opening, and also has a small flap covering the rear camera that automatically starts the camera application when lifted.

The ThinkPad 8 runs the Microsoft Windows 8 operating system and comes standard with Microsoft Office.

History 
The ThinkPad 8 was launched in the United States in late January 2014, at a starting price of $449.

, it has been discontinued on the Lenovo's online store in the United States.

See also 

 Comparison of tablet computers
 History of tablet computers
 ThinkPad Tablet

References

External links 
 Lenovo ThinkPad 8 review: Sharp screen, worst-in-class battery life, Engadget, May 1, 2014, by Dana Wollman
 Review: Two 8-inch Lenovo tablets, only one clear purpose, Ars Technica, March 30, 2014, by Peter Bright
 Why I Won't Switch To Lenovo's ThinkPad 8, Business Insider, April 1, 2014, by Kyle Rusell

Lenovo
Tablet computers
Tablet computers introduced in 2014